F1 grenade may refer to:

F1 grenade (Australia)
F1 grenade (France) 
F-1 grenade (Russia)